The duodenal bulb is the portion of the duodenum closest to the stomach. It normally has a length of about 5 centimeters. The duodenal bulb begins at the pylorus and ends at the neck of the gallbladder. It is located posterior to the liver and the gallbladder and superior to the pancreatic head. The gastroduodenal artery, portal vein, and common bile duct lie just behind it. The distal part of the bulb is located retroperitoneally. It is located immediately distal to the pyloric sphincter.

The duodenal bulb is the place where duodenal ulcers occur. Duodenal ulcers are more common than gastric ulcers and unlike gastric ulcers, are caused by increased gastric acid secretion. Duodenal ulcers are commonly located anteriorly, and rarely posteriorly. Anterior ulcers can be complicated by perforation, while the posterior ones bleed. The reason for that is explained by their location. The peritoneal or abdominal cavity is located anterior to the duodenum. Therefore, if the ulcer grows deep enough, it will perforate, whereas if a posterior ulcer grows deep enough, it will penetrate the gastroduodenal artery and bleed.

Notes

External links
 Diagram - look for figure #2, item #5
 
 Images at gastrolab.net

Digestive system